Akhmanovo (Axman) is a rural locality (a selo) and the administrative centre of Akhmanovsky Selsoviet, Bakalinsky District, Bashkortostan, Russia. The population was 476 as of 2010. There are 2  streets.

Geography 
Akhmanovo is located 9 km southwest of Bakaly (the district's administrative centre) by road. Starye Balykly is the nearest rural locality.

References 

Rural localities in Bakalinsky District